Rhoicissus is an Afrotropical plant genus in the grape family Vitaceae and subfamily Vitoideae. There are between nine and twenty-two accepted species.

The leaves of species R. tomentosa and R. tridentata are eaten by caterpillars of the silver striped hawkmoth (Hippotion celerio).

Selected species
The genus includes the following species:
Rhoicissus digitata (L.f.) Gilg & Brandt
Rhoicissus drepanophylla Gilg
Rhoicissus edulis De Wild.
Rhoicissus holstii Engl.
Rhoicissus kougabergensis Retief & van Jaarsv.
Rhoicissus laetans Retief
Rhoicissus megalismontanus Oberm.
Rhoicissus napaeus C.A.Sm.
Rhoicissus revoilii Planch.
Rhoicissus rhomboidea (E.Mey. ex Harv.) Planch.
Rhoicissus sansibarensis Gilg
Rhoicissus schlechteri Gilg & Brandt
Rhoicissus sekhukhuniensis Retief, S.J.Siebert & A.E.van Wyk
Rhoicissus sessilifolia Retief
Rhoicissus tomentosa (Lam.) Wild & R.B.Drumm.
Rhoicissus tridentata (L.f.) Wild & R.B.Drumm.
Rhoicissus usambarensis Gilg
Rhoicissus verdickii De Wild.

References

Vitaceae
Vitaceae genera
Creepers of South Africa